James Hart Merrell (born 1953 in Minnesota) is the Lucy Maynard Salmon Professor of History at Vassar College. Merrell is primarily a scholar of early American history, and has written extensively on Native American history during the colonial era. He is one of only five historians to be awarded the Bancroft Prize twice.

Education 
He was raised in Minnesota. Merrell earned his undergraduate degree at Lawrence University and continued his studies at Oxford University as a Rhodes Scholar. He received his Ph.D. from Johns Hopkins University in 1982.

Career 
Merrell was a Fellow at The Newberry Library Center for the History of the American Indian in Chicago and at the Institute of Early American History and Culture in Williamsburg, Virginia. He has also received fellowships from the American Council of Learned Societies, the John Simon Guggenheim Memorial Foundation, and the National Endowment for the Humanities.

He has taught at Vassar College since 1984, except for the 1998–1999 academic year, when he was a professor at Northwestern University.

Awards 
 1991 Guggenheim Fellowship
 1990 Frederick Jackson Turner Award, for The Indians' New World: Catawbas and their Neighbors from European Contact Through the Era of Removal 
 The Merle Curti Award from the Organization of American Historians
 Bancroft Prize (twice)
1990 – The Indians' New World: Catawbas and Their Neighbors from European Contact through the Era of Removal
2000 – Into the American Woods: Negotiators on the Pennsylvania Frontier
 Finalist for the Pulitzer Prize for History for Into the American Woods: Negotiators on the Pennsylvania Frontier

Bibliography

References 

Johns Hopkins University alumni
American Rhodes Scholars
Living people
1953 births
Vassar College faculty
Historians of the Southern United States
History of the Thirteen Colonies
Lawrence University alumni
Northwestern University faculty
Historians from Minnesota
Bancroft Prize winners